Group B of the 2012 Fed Cup Europe/Africa Zone Group III was one of two pools in the Europe/Africa zone of the 2012 Fed Cup. Five teams competed in a round robin competition, with the top two teams and the bottom teams proceeding to their respective sections of the play-offs: the top teams played for advancement to the Group II.

Egypt vs. Cyprus

Tunisia vs. Moldova

Lithuania vs. Namibia

Egypt vs. Namibia

Tunisia vs. Cyprus

Lithuania vs. Moldova

Egypt vs. Lithuania

Tunisia vs. Namibia

Moldova vs. Cyprus

Egypt vs. Tunisia

Lithuania vs. Cyprus

Moldova vs. Namibia

Egypt vs. Moldova

Tunisia vs. Lithuania

Cyprus vs. Namibia

See also 
 Fed Cup structure

References

External links 
 Fed Cup website

2012 Fed Cup Europe/Africa Zone